Mollahasan is a village in the Göle District, Ardahan Province, Turkey. Its population is 330 (2021). It is close to the border with Armenia. The village is located 66 km from the Ardahan city center and 23 km from the Göle town center. There is no primary school in this village.

It has been recorded as Mollahasan since 1886 in the Turkish census. The village locals were first from the "indigenous" Turkish class, being a Zaza village that migrated from Kiğı before the War of '93 (1877-1878). The locals were gradually replaced over time by Kurdish-Sunnis after Kurdish people settled there.

Population

References

Villages in Göle District